Punta Lobos is a headland and was a launch site for sounding rockets in Peru at . Between 1980 and 1990, various rockets of the type super Loki, Nike Orion, Taurus Orion and Taurus Tomahawk were launched there.

External links
Rocket launch site Punta Lobos

Headlands of Peru
Rocket launch sites